Yvette Broch (born 23 December 1990) is a Dutch handball player, who plays for Győri ETO KC and the Dutch national team. She is also known for being a runner up on the fourth season of Holland's Next Top Model.

She completed in the 2011 World Women's Handball Championship in Brazil. She competed on the Dutch team at the 2014 European Women's Handball Championship in Hungary and Croatia, and won a silver team medal at the 2015 World Championship finals. She competed at the 2016 Summer Olympics in the women's handball tournament.

In August 2018 she decided to suspend her professional handball career, due to exhaustion. In 2020, she returned to handball and trained with her former French handball club, Metz. After the season, she signed a 2-year-contact with the Romanian club, CSM Bucuresti. After one season she returned to her former Hungarian handball club, Győri Audi ETO KC. She signed a 2-year-contact.

Achievements
National team
 World Championship:
Silver Medalist: 2015
Bronze Medalist: 2017
 European Championship:
Silver Medalist: 2016
European competitions
EHF Champions League:
Winner: 2017, 2018
Finalist: 2016
EHF Cup:
Finalist: 2013
Domestic competitions
Romanian Cup:
Winner: 2022
Romanian Supercup:
Finalist: 2021
Nemzeti Bajnokság I
Gold Medalist: 2016, 2017, 2018
Magyar Kupa
Gold Medalist: 2016, 2018
Silver Medalist: 2017
French Championship
Gold Medalist: 2013, 2014
Silver Medalist: 2015
Coupe de France
Gold Medalist: 2013

Individual awards
Best Defender of the 2022 Romanian Cup
French Championship Best Pivot: 2015
All Star Pivot of the European Championship: 2016
All Star Pivot of the 2017 World Championship

References

External links

1990 births
Living people
Top Model finalists
Dutch female handball players
People from Monster
Expatriate handball players
Dutch expatriate sportspeople in Spain
Dutch expatriate sportspeople in France
Dutch expatriate sportspeople in Hungary
Handball players at the 2016 Summer Olympics
Olympic handball players of the Netherlands
Győri Audi ETO KC players
Sportspeople from South Holland
21st-century Dutch women